The Technical Achievement Award is one of three Scientific and Technical Awards given from time to time by the Academy of Motion Picture Arts and Sciences. (The other two awards are the Scientific and Engineering Award and the Academy Award of Merit.) The Technical Achievement Award is an honorary award that is given annually to those whose particular technical accomplishments have contributed to the progress of the motion picture industry. The award is a certificate, which describes the achievement and lists the names of those being honored for the particular contribution. These awards are usually given at a dinner ceremony held weeks prior to the Academy Awards broadcast and a brief excerpt is shown in the Oscars telecast.

Winners
See :Category:Academy Award for Technical Achievement winners.

References

External links
"Technical Achievement Award" – Description and photograph of this Academy Award on the official website of the Academy Awards (oscars.org). Lefthand menu links to these other related Honorary Awards; top menu includes links to home page and searchable Official Academy Award Database, with information about the winners of these awards and their official Academy Award citations.

Technical Achievement
American science and technology awards